Upton–Avenue Market station (formerly known simply as Upton station) is an underground Metro SubwayLink station in West Baltimore, Maryland located near the intersection of Pennsylvania Avenue and Laurens Street. The station takes its name from the surrounding Upton neighborhood and the nearby Avenue Market at 1700 Pennsylvania Avenue. It is the ninth most northern and western station on the line.

Station layout

History

Upton–Avenue Market station was referred to as the Laurens Street station during its planning and construction, in reference to the street which intersects Pennsylvania Avenue nearby.

Excavation and construction

The Laurens Street section of tunnels at Upton–Avenue Market station were constructed in a cut-and-cover operation through deeply weathered residual rock from a parent granitic gneiss material. Extensive exploration and mapping of the subsurface conditions was conducted prior to excavation and construction in order to obtain a detailed understanding of the heterogeneous mixture of soft and hard residual material at the site. This profile informed the support and mining procedures implemented for the project. Classification of the residual materials informed the tunnel design, which was supported by liner plates, steel ribs, posts, wall plates, and invert struts; the final lining was made from reinforced, cast in-place concrete. The presence of hard, dense rock-like fragments among the residual material necessitated some blasting methods in addition to conventional earth excavation methods.

References

External links
Laurens Street entrance from Google Maps Street View

Metro SubwayLink stations
Railway stations in the United States opened in 1983
1983 establishments in Maryland
Railway stations in Baltimore